Fir Tree is a village in County Durham, in England. It is west of Crook, near the River Wear.

Fir Tree has a petrol station and two pubs: The Duke of York and The Fir Tree Country Hotel. According to the 2001 census , Fir Tree had a population of 226. Wear Valley Council say the population , according to the census of 2007 (for Wear Valley) was 314. It is approximately 2 mi from the small market town of Crook and 6 mi from the large market town Bishop Auckland. Approximately 1 mi northwest of the village is the World War II Harperley POW Camp 93.

References

Villages in County Durham
Crook, County Durham